Marcelo Herrera Herbert (born 23 May 1947) is a Mexican politician affiliated with the Party of the Democratic Revolution. He served as Deputy of the LIX Legislature of the Mexican Congress as a plurinominal representative.

References

1947 births
Living people
Politicians from Veracruz
Members of the Chamber of Deputies (Mexico)
Party of the Democratic Revolution politicians
People from Pánuco, Veracruz
National Autonomous University of Mexico alumni
21st-century Mexican politicians
Deputies of the LIX Legislature of Mexico